Intraductal papillary neoplasm of the bile duct, also known as intraductal papillary biliary neoplasm, is a rare type of liver cancer.

References

External links 

Cancer